China National Highway 671, also known as the Heshui-Huachi Highway, is a highway under construction in China. The highway connects Heshui County and Huachi County in Gansu. Construction on the highway began on 13 May 2022.

References

671
Transport in China
Transport in Gansu